Emperor's College of Traditional Oriental Medicine is a graduate school of traditional Oriental medicine in Santa Monica, California. Founded in 1983, it offers master's and doctoral programs with full accreditation in acupuncture and Oriental medicine.

Academics
The college offers two degrees:
Masters of Traditional Oriental Medicine: The Master of Traditional Oriental Medicine (MTOM) degree at Emperor's College of Traditional Oriental Medicine is accredited by the Accreditation Commission for Acupuncture and Oriental Medicine (ACAOM) which is the accrediting agency recognized by the U.S. Department of Education for the approval of programs preparing acupuncture and Oriental medicine practitioners.

Doctorate of Acupuncture and Oriental Medicine: The Doctor of Acupuncture and Oriental Medicine (DAOM) program at Emperor's College is fully accredited by the Accreditation Commission for Acupuncture and Oriental Medicine (ACAOM) which is the accrediting agency recognized by the U.S. Department of Education for the approval of programs preparing acupuncture and Oriental medicine practitioners.

The college also offers licensure and certification for acupuncture and Oriental medicine. Emperor's College of Traditional Oriental Medicine is approved by the California Acupuncture Board  and graduates of the MTOM program are eligible to sit for the California Acupuncture Licensing Examination. Emperor's MTOM program also meets the licensure requirements of most states that license practitioners of acupuncture and Oriental medicine. Graduates of the master's program are also eligible to sit for the NCCAOM examination and become certified by the National Certification Commission for Acupuncture and Oriental Medicine.

History

1983	Emperor's College founded.

1989	Receives Acupuncture and Oriental Medicine national accreditation.

1997	Partners with a hospital to allow interns to treat acute care patients at Daniel Freeman Hospital in Los Angeles.

1999	Partners with UCLA Arthur Ashe Student Health Center.

2000	Emperor's College clinicians participate in acupuncture research trials with Cedars Sinai Hospital post-cardiac surgical patients, and with USC Keck School of Medicine in stroke research.

2004	Establishes Doctorate in Acupuncture and Oriental Medicine.

2006	Doctoral Program is awarded a research grant to study effects of acupuncture on quality of care and cost of hospitalization with Good Samaritan Hospital Acute Rehabilitation Unit.

2009	Doctoral Program granted accreditation candidacy by ACAOM.

2011	Partners with The Roy and Patricia Disney Family Cancer Center.

2011	Stroke Rehabilitation and Dementia Care Clinic launches at Emperor's College Acupuncture Clinic 

2014	Partners with BeingAlive!LA, and launches acupuncture clinic for HIV+ individuals at their West Hollywood Offices.

2015	Served as a health and wellness provider for the Special Olympic World Games in Los Angeles.

2015	Treated homeless vets at the 2015 Los Angeles Veteran and Families Stand Down, the largest event of its kind in the United States.

References

External links
 Official website

Acupuncture organizations
Organizations based in Santa Monica, California
Universities and colleges in Los Angeles County, California
Educational institutions established in 1983
1983 establishments in California
Private universities and colleges in California